Såtbakkollen is a  tall mountain in Sunndal Municipality in Møre og Romsdal county, Norway.  It is located in the Trollheimen mountain range, just north of the Sunndalen valley.  It forms the southern end of the "Tårn massif", which also includes Tåga, Tårnfjellet, and the quite famous Innerdalstårnet. Other mountains nearby include Navardalsnebba, Trolla, and Skarfjellet.

The name "Såtbakkollen" is also commonly used for the peak Tåga (elevation: ,; second highest point in Trollheimen).  Tåga is actually located about  further north, probably because the name "Tåga" was missing from older maps.

References 

Mountains of Møre og Romsdal
Sunndal